Greenfield Preparative Meeting House, also known as the Catskill Meeting House, is a historic Quaker meeting house located in Grahamsville in Sullivan County, New York.  It was built in 1838–1839, and is a one-story, six bay by two bay, rectangular wood-frame building with gable roof.  It has an attached privy.  It is sided in cedar clapboards and measures approximately 19 feet by 39 feet.

It was added to the National Register of Historic Places in 2010.

References

Quaker meeting houses in New York (state)
Churches on the National Register of Historic Places in New York (state)
Churches completed in 1839
Churches in Sullivan County, New York
19th-century Quaker meeting houses
National Register of Historic Places in Sullivan County, New York